Francesco Pio Tamburrino (born 6 January 1939 in Oppido Lucano) was the Roman Catholic Archbishop of the Archdiocese of Foggia-Bovino from 2003 to 2014. He was Vice President of the Episcopal Conference of Puglia, Italy. 

He moved with his family as a child in Cesano Maderno, and at 11 he entered the Benedictine Abbey of Praglia, where he attended the gymnasium. He attended High School in Parma, Italy, and then the two years of philosophy at the Abbey of Pia. He graduated in Theology from the Pontifical Athenaeum of St Anselm in Rome.
On 11 October 1955 he issued the first profession as a member of the Order of St. Benedict. On 29 August 1965 he was ordained a priest of the Order of St. Benedict and 29 November 1989 he was appointed abbot of Territorial Montevergine.

On 14 February 1998, he was appointed Bishop of the Diocese of Teggiano-Policastro. Was ordained on 25 March 1998, consecrating Cardinal Michele Giordano, Archbishop Gerardo Pierro coconsacranti and Archbishop Serafino Sprovieri.

On 27 April 1999 he was assigned to the Roman Curia as secretary of the Congregation for Divine Worship and the Discipline of the Sacraments.

Service
 Territorial Abbot of Montevergine (Italy) (November 29, 1989 – February 14, 1998)
 Bishop of Teggiano–Policastro (Italy) (February 14, 1998 – April 27, 1999)
 Secretary of Congregation for Divine Worship and the Discipline of the Sacraments (April 27, 1999 – August 2, 2003)
 Metropolitan Archbishop of Foggia – Bovino (Italy) (August 2, 2003 – present)

References
 GCatholic.org
 Catholic Hierarchy

1939 births
Living people
People from the Province of Potenza
21st-century Italian Roman Catholic archbishops
Bishops in Apulia